The 1991 Baltic Cup football competition took place from 15 to 17 November 1991 at the Žalgiris Stadium in Klaipėda, Lithuania. It was the first competition of the three Baltic states – Latvia, Lithuania and Estonia – since they regained their independence from the Soviet Union, earlier that year. The FIFA did not recognize the games as full internationals.

Results

Lithuania vs Estonia

Latvia vs Estonia

Lithuania vs Latvia

Final table

Winners

Statistics

Goalscorers

References
RSSSF
RSSSF Details
omnitel 

1991
Baltic Cup
Baltic Cup
Baltic Cup
1991